Peter Steiger (born 23 January 1960) is a retired Swiss cyclist. Between 1984 and 1991 he won seven national championships in motor-paced racing. In this discipline he also won the world championships in 1992 and finished in second place in 1990 and 1991. Steiger was also a successful road racer and won the Bay Classic Series in 1989.

In March 1993 he was hit by a truck during training in Mexico and had to retire due to injuries.

References

1960 births
Living people
Swiss male cyclists
People from Winterthur District
UCI Track Cycling World Champions (men)
Swiss track cyclists
Sportspeople from the canton of Zürich